California Joe may refer to:

California Joe (military), private, Company C, 1st United States Sharpshooters in American Civil War
California Joe Milner, American miner and frontier scout
California Joe (film), American 1943 western